3-D is the debut studio album by American electronicore band I See Stars. The album debuted at number 176 on the Billboard 200, number 5 on Top Heatseekers, and number 22 on Top Independent Albums. The songs "Save the Cheerleader" and "The Big Bad Wolf" were both re-recorded from their first EP, Green Light Go!. The singles "The Common Hours", "3D" and "Where the Sidewalk Ends", were also re-recorded, having been previously released as demos.  All of the band members were under the age of 20 by the time the album was recorded, with the oldest being rhythm guitarist Jimmy Gregerson who was 19 at the time.

Track listing 
All lyrics written by Andrew and Devin Oliver, all music composed by I See Stars.

Note
 "Save the Cheerleader" is printed in its full title "Save the Cheerleader, Save the World" on vinyl release and on some online retailers.

Other media

References to other media 
"Where the Sidewalk Ends" is a reference to Shel Silverstein's poetry book, Where the Sidewalk Ends.
"I Am Jack's Smirking Revenge" is a reference to 20th Century Fox's 1999 film Fight Club.
"Save the Cheerleader, Save the World" is a reference to the NBC show Heroes first season motto.
"The Big Bad Wolf" is a reference to Charles Perrault's fairy tale Little Red Riding Hood.

Appearances in other media 
The song "Comfortably Confused" appeared in the music video game Power Gig: Rise of the SixString.
The single "What This Means to Me" was included as a track on the compilation album Atticus: IV produced by Atticus Clothing.

Personnel 
I See Stars
 Brent Allen – lead guitar
 Jimmy Gregerson – rhythm guitar
 Zach Johnson – unclean vocals, keyboards, synthesizers, sequencer, programming
 Andrew Oliver – drums, percussion, backing vocals
 Devin Oliver – clean vocals
 Jeff Valentine – bass guitar

Production
 Cameron Mizell - production, mastering and mixing
 James Paul Wisner - pre-production
 Shawn Keith - A&R

References 

2009 debut albums
I See Stars albums
Sumerian Records albums